Fake or Fortune? is a BBC One documentary television series which examines the provenance and attribution of notable artworks. Since the first series aired in 2011, Fake or Fortune? has drawn audiences of up to 5 million viewers in the UK, the highest for an arts show in that country.

Fake or Fortune? was created by art dealer and historian Philip Mould, together with producer Simon Shaw. It was inspired by Mould's 2009 book Sleuth, after which the programme was originally to be entitled. It is co-presented by Mould and journalist Fiona Bruce, with specialist research carried out by Bendor Grosvenor during the first 5 series. Forensic analysis and archival research is carried out by various fine art specialists. Each series first aired on BBC One, except for series 3, which was shown mistakenly on SVT in Sweden before being broadcast in the UK.

Format
In each episode Philip Mould and Fiona Bruce focus their attention on a painting (or a group of paintings), usually related to one particular artist. They travel around the country and the world, studying the artists at exhibitions, meeting up with international experts and following up local leads. Series 7, episode 5 saw the show tackle their first sculpture, a work attributed to Alberto Giacometti. The team, assisted by art historian Bendor Grosvenor in series 1 to 5, and professor Aviva Burnstock, Head of the Department of Conservation and Technology at The Courtauld Institute of Art, in later series, investigate the paintings on a number of fronts: establishing the provenance of the piece by working backwards from present day to the time of the work's creation; on a forensic level, with investigation and scientific tests on the materials used to help establish specific time frames; and examining the unique painting styles and quirks of the artist. This evidence is then presented to established authorities to help demonstrate the legitimacy of the work and its possible addition to the relevant catalogue raisonné.

The team does not always succeed. Philip Mould was stated to have considered the Series 4 case of a Churchill painting as one of the most unsatisfactory endings to date, before it was finally authenticated in 2020.

Series overview

</ref>

Episodes

Series 1 (2011)
There were four episodes in the first series, which started on 19 June 2011:

Series 2 (2012)
The first episode of the second series was shown in the UK on 16 September 2012. The series had three episodes:

Series 3 (2014)
The third series features four episodes. The first episode was first shown on 27 December 2013 on Sweden's SVT, with episodes 2 and 3 shown in the following weeks. Philip Mould described the appearance on Swedish television weeks ahead of the British premiere as a "weird BBC World cock-up". SVT on its website described the programme at the time as a "" (British documentary from 2012).

Series 4 (2015)
The series had four episodes:

Series 5 (2016)

Filming for the fifth series started on 24 November 2015. The four-episode series was broadcast on 17 July 2016.

Series 6 (2017)

The sixth series started on 20 August 2017. It was originally planned to have four episodes before one, "Giacometti", was postponed.

Series 7 (2018)

The seventh series consists of five episodes and started on 12 August 2018.

 Series 7 was broadcast at the same time that BARB changed their ratings system, the ratings have been sourced as follows: Episodes 1-3 are 28 day figures from BARB's old system. Episode 4 are 28 day figures from the new system. Episode 5 are 7 day figures from the old system.

Series 8 (2019)
On 25 July 2019 the eighth series began broadcast.

Series 9 (2021)
The Coronavirus pandemic disrupted the production schedule, but in September 2020 Philip Mould announced that pre-production of the ninth series had started. The ninth series, comprising four episodes, began on 26 July 2021.

Series 10 (2022)

Reception
Describing the outcome of the first episode of series one as a "scandal", Sam Wollaston writing for The Guardian found the programme "incredibly interesting" and praised it "for being about just one case in which you can become totally involved, instead of flitting between three, which is what so many documentaries seem to do". In The Daily Telegraph, Ceri Radford was described as being "flabbergasted" at the result of the first episode, but concluded her review by saying: "This may have been a disappointing finale, but it at least confirmed that this aesthetically pleasing, quietly enjoyable new series isn't afraid to thwart expectations." Tom Sutcliffe in The Independent had a mixed view as a result of the presentation of the facts, saying: "It was full of cliffhanger tension and thrilling moments of discovery. But I couldn't entirely shift the suspicion that some of it was just a little too good to be true."

The first programme of the third series, shown in the UK on 19 January 2014, had 4.8 million viewers (a 21.8% audience share) while the first programme of the fourth series attracted 4.85m (24.5%). The record audience for the series was on 12 July 2015 with a peak attendance of 5.8 million viewers (episode 4.2 "Renoir").

Reviewing an episode of the seventh series, Michael Hogan of The Daily Telegraph wrote: "Arts programming is an increasingly endangered beast on prime time television. This absorbing and enjoyable series flies the flag in quietly thrilling fashion."

Benji Wilson, writing for The Daily Telegraph, described the programme, then in its ninth series, as "the art world's answer to Line of Duty".

International broadcasts

The programme had its North American premiere on Canada's TVOntario in 2011. It has also started airing in fall 2013 on PBS and Ovation in October 2019 in syndicated second-run broadcasts after PBS in the United States, and Series 4 has been available on Netflix (as Season 1) since December 2018.
The programme airs on ABC in Australia.

Notes

References

Further reading

External links
 
 

 
BBC television documentaries
Documentary television series about art
Art forgery
2010s British documentary television series
2020s British documentary television series
2011 British television series debuts
English-language television shows
Television series by BBC Studios